A by-election for the Prague 10 Senate seat was held in the Czech Republic on 19–20 September 2014 and 26–27 September 2014. The election was held after incumbent Jaromír Štětina got elected member of European Parliament. Voter turnout was 15.8% for first round and 8.75% for second round. It was the lowest voter turnout for any Senate election so far.

Cabrnochová remained Senator until 2016 Senate election when she received 12% and was eliminated in the first round.

Results

References

Prague 10 by-election
Prague 10 by-election, 2014
2014
Senate district 22 – Prague 10
Elections in Prague
Prague 10 by-election